Statistics of North American Soccer League in season 1974. This was the 7th season of the NASL.

Overview
Fifteen teams comprised the league with the Los Angeles Aztecs winning the championship in a penalty kick shootout over the Miami Toros.

Changes from the previous season

Rules changes
The league decided to do away with tie games. If a match was tied after 90 minutes, the teams would go directly to a standard penalty shootout with no extra time played. The outcome would appear in the standings as a 'tie-win'. The tie-winner would gain three points, plus goals in regulation, while the loser of the tie-breaker received no points, except for regulation goals. Including the 1974 NASL Final, 33 matches were decided using this method.

New teams

Baltimore Comets
Boston Minutemen
Denver Dynamos
Los Angeles Aztecs

San Jose Earthquakes
Seattle Sounders
Vancouver Whitecaps
Washington Diplomats

Teams folding
Atlanta Apollos
Montreal Olympique

Teams moving
None

Name changes
None

Regular season
W = Wins, L = Losses, T= PK Shootout Wins, GF = Goals For, GA = Goals Against, PT= point system

6 points for a win,
3 points for a PK shootout win,
0 points for a loss,
1 point for each goal scored up to three per game.
-Premiers (most points). -Other playoff teams.

NASL All-Stars

Playoffs
All playoff games in all rounds including the NASL Final were single game elimination match ups.

Bracket

Quarterfinals

Semifinals

NASL Final 1974

1974 NASL Champions: Los Angeles Aztecs

Post season awards
Most Valuable Player: Peter Silvester, Baltimore
Coach of the year: John Young, Miami
Rookie of the year: Douglas McMillan, Los Angeles

References

External links
Complete Results and Standings

 
North American Soccer League (1968–1984) seasons
1974 in American soccer leagues
1974 in Canadian soccer